Restoration House in Rochester, Kent in England, is a fine example of an Elizabethan mansion.  It is so named after the visit of King Charles II on the eve of his restoration.

Charles had landed in Dover on 25 May 1660 and by the evening of the 28th arrived in Rochester.  He was received by the Mayor and eventually retired for the night to the home of Colonel Gibbon.  The following day Charles continued to London and was proclaimed King on 29 May, his 30th birthday.  Although the home of Colonel Gibbon, the property was actually owned by Sir Francis Clerke (he was knighted during the visit), a fact which has led to confusion in the past.

Although it is a private home, the house and garden are open to the public during the summer. The house is protected as a Grade I listed building.

History
Restoration House was originally two medieval buildings (1454 and 1502–22) with a space between. They were joined in 1640–1660 (tree ring data from roof) by inserting a third building between the two, to create a larger house. The first owner of the completed house was Henry Clerke, a lawyer and Rochester MP.  Clerke caused further works in 1670, the refacing of the entrance facade, the Great Staircase and other internal works. The house was then bought by William Bockenham. It was owned by Stephen T. Aveling in the late 19th century, and he wrote a history of the house which was published in Vol. 15 of "Archaeologia Cantiana".

The house was purchased for £270,000 by the English entertainer Rod Hull, in 1986, to save it from being turned into a car park; and he then spent another £500,000 restoring it. It was taken by the Receiver in 1994 to cover an unpaid tax bill.

The current owners over the past decade have uncovered decoration schemes from the mid 17th century, which reveal the fashionable taste of the period, much influenced by the fashions on the continent.

Charles Dickens
According to the biographer John Forster, the novelist Charles Dickens, who lived nearby, used Restoration House as a model for Miss Havisham's Satis House in Great Expectations. The name "Satis House" belongs to the house where Rochester MP, Sir Richard Watts, entertained Queen Elizabeth I; it is now the administrative office of King's School, Rochester.

References

External links
 Official Website 

Country houses in Kent
Historic house museums in Kent
Grade I listed houses in Kent
Rochester, Kent